Fredericus Soetrisno Harjadi (December 26, 1899 – April 9, 1969) was an Indonesian politician from the Catholic Party. He was appointed as the Minister of Social Affairs in the Natsir Cabinet.

After finishing his school, Harjadi became a teacher at a MULO school. He ended his career as a teacher when he, along with I. J. Kasimo, established the Catholic Party in the Dutch East Indies. His political career later brought him to be appointed as the seventh Minister of Social Affairs in the Natsir Cabinet, from 6 September 1950 until 21 March 1951.

He was married to Raden Ayu Soenarlestariah in 1922. Soenarlestariah was born on 12 May 1904, and she was the great-great-great-granddaughter of Pakubuwono I.

References

Bibliography 

Indonesian Roman Catholics
1899 births
Javanese people
1969 deaths
Government ministers of Indonesia
People from Yogyakarta